Vincent Peirani (born 24 April 1980) is a French jazz accordionist, vocalist and composer who has played internationally, collaborating with Denis Colin, François Jeanneau, Youn Sun Nah, Émile Parisien, Michel Portal, Louis Sclavis, and Michael Wollny, among others.

Career 

He studied clarinet and solfège at the Conservatoire de Paris. He received several awards, including international awards, between 1994 and 1998, such as the 1998 Prix d'Accordéon Classique of the conservatory. He turned to jazz the same year.

In 2000, Peirani won a First Prize in jazz and a First Prize in music theory and jazz harmony. From 2001, he studied jazz and improvisation at the Conservatoire de Paris, with Daniel Humair, Dré Pallemaerts, Hervé Sellin, Patrick Moutal (Indian Music), François Théberge, Riccardo Del Fra, and Glenn Ferris. He graduated with distinction in June 2004, after winning first prize in the national jazz competition of La Défense with saxophonist  in 2003. He made jazz recordings from 2003, beginning with an album with the European Jazz Youth Orchestra (Swinging Europe). In 2010 he first recorded his own compositions (Gunung Sebatu). He recorded in duo with the cellist François Salque, including the album Tanguillo.

He founded a quintet, Living Being, playing from 2013 with the trumpeter Mathias Eick and the vocalist . They played at the 10th Jazzahead Festival in Bremen.

In 2016, he recorded the album Tandem with pianist Michael Wollny. A reviewer called it a symbiotic result, interpretations following the intentions of the composers (Interpretationen im Sinn der Komponisten). Peirani was invited by Wollny–then artist in residence of the Rheingau Musik Festival–to play a concert at the Kurhaus Wiesbaden also with vocalist Andreas Schaerer and the saxophonist Émile Parisien. A reviewer noted his at times impressionistic sensitivity for sounds and his tender finesse.

Awards 
In 2014, Peirani was awarded the Frank Ténot prize of the Victoires du Jazz as the "Instrumental revelation". In May 2015, he received an Echo Jazz both as an instrumentalist and for his duo with Michael Wollny. His albums Thrill Box and Tandem were also awarded the prize. In 2016, he was named a Chevalier of the Order of Arts and Letters.

Discography 
Peirani has made many recording, mostly for ACT.

As leader or co-leader
 2009 – Gunung Sebatu with Vincent Lê Quang (saxophone), Zig Zag Territoires
 2008 – Mélosolex, Label Ouïe / Anticraft distribution
 2011 – Est with François Salque (cello), Zig Zag Territoires
 2011 – Vagabond, with Lars Danielsson / Ulf Wakenius, ACT
 2012 – Thrill Box with Michael Wollny (p) and Michel Benita (b), ACT
 2014 – Belle Époque with Émile Parisien, ACT
 2015 – Living Being, with Émile Parisien (cl, ts), Yoann Serra (d),  (Fender Rhodes), Julien Herné (elb), ACT
 2016 – Tandem, with Peirani and Wollny, ACT

Participations

 2013 – Stromae, Racine carrée, Mercury Records
 2013 – Journal Intime, Extension des Feux, Neuklang Records
 2013 – Richard Bona, Bonafied, Universal Jazz
 2013 – Youn Sun Nah, Lento, ACT
 2013 – Thiefs, Melanine Harmonic Recordings
 2013 – Gael Faye, Pili Pili Sur Un Croissant Au Beurre, Universal Music
 2013 – Serena Fisseau, D'Une, Île à l'Autre, Naïve
 2012 – Daniel Humair, Sweet & Sour, Laborie
 2011 – Bénabar, Les Bénéfices du doute
 2010 – Roberto Alagna, Live à Nîmes (DVD), Universal Music
 2010 – Les Yeux Noirs, Tiganeasca, Zig Zag Territoires
 2010 – Livre disque pour enfants Mon imagier des amusettes, Tomes 1 and 2, Gallimard
 2009 – David Sire, David Sire, Sélénote
 2009 – Laurent Korcia, Cinéma, EMI
 2009 – Mike Ibrahim, La Route du Nord, Universal / Polydor
 2008 – Sanseverino, Sanseverino aux Bouffes du Nord, Sony / BMG
 2007 – Hadrien Feraud, Dreyfus Records
 2007 – Les Yeux Noirs, Oprescena, ZZT
 2007 – Olivier Calmel, Empreintes, Musica Guild
 2007 – Yves Simon, Rumeurs, Universal / Barclay
 2006 –  and Éric Slabiak, Orphée Dilo and autres contes des Balkans, Naïve
 2006 – Muriel Bloch and Éric Slabiak, Carte postale des Balkans, Naïve
 2006 – , Air Libre, Allgorythm
 2005 – , Merci pour les fleurs, Symbolic
 2005 – Le Cirque Des Mirages, Fumée d'Opium, Universal Music
 2004 – , Sophie Forte, Niark Productions
 2003 – Lansiné Kouyaté and David Neerman, Kangaba, Popcornlab
 2003 – Youn Sun Nah, Down By Love, HUB Music/Warner EMI Korea
 2003 – The European Union Jazz Youth Orchestra, European Jazz Orchestra 2003, Music Mecca
 2002 – Les Yeux Noirs, Live, (EMI/Odéon)

References

External links 

 
 
 

Living people
French jazz musicians
French jazz accordionists
Conservatoire de Paris alumni
French composers
ACT Music artists
1980 births
People from Nice
Chevaliers of the Ordre des Arts et des Lettres
21st-century accordionists